This is a list of the main career statistics of French professional tennis player Gaël Monfils. All statistics are according to the ATP Tour and ITF website.

Performance timelines

Singles
Current through the 2022 Canadian Open.

Doubles

Significant finals

Masters tournament finals

Singles: 3 (3 runner-ups)

ATP Tour career finals

Monfils reached a final for 16 consecutive seasons, and is one of seven players in the Open Era to do so for 16 or more seasons.

Singles: 33 (11 titles, 22 runner-ups)

ITF Futures and ATP Challenger Tour finals

Singles: 8 (7 titles, 1 runner-up)

Doubles: 2 (2 runner-ups)

Other finals

Team competitions finals: 2 (2 runner-ups)

ITF Junior Circuit

Singles: 9 (5 titles, 4 runner-ups)

Doubles: 1 (1 title)

Record against top 10 players 

Monfils's match record against those who have been ranked in the Top 10, with those who have been No. 1 in boldface, and retired players in italics.

Singles 

  Richard Gasquet 11–7
  John Isner 7–6
  Radek Štěpánek 6–3
  Andy Roddick 5–3
  Kevin Anderson 6–1
  Marin Čilić 4–0
  Marat Safin 4–0
  Roberto Bautista Agut 4–1
  Marcos Baghdatis 4–1
  Grigor Dimitrov 4–1
  Jürgen Melzer 4–1
  Janko Tipsarević 4–2
  Jo Wilfried Tsonga 4–4
  Roger Federer 4–10 
  Ernests Gulbis 3–0
  David Nalbandian 3–1
  Alexander Zverev 3–1
  James Blake 3–2
  Pablo Carreño Busta 3–3
  Fernando Verdasco 3–3
  Nicolás Almagro 3–3
  David Ferrer 3–3
  Milos Raonic 3–3
  Stan Wawrinka 3–3
  Ivan Ljubičić 3–4
  Gilles Simon 3–7
  Arnaud Clément 2–0
  Fernando González 2–0
  Gastón Gaudio 2–0
  Lucas Pouille 2–0
  Daniil Medvedev 2–1
  Sébastien Grosjean 2–1
  Nikolay Davydenko 2–2
  Tommy Haas 2–2
  Lleyton Hewitt 2–2
  David Goffin 2–3
  Tommy Robredo 2–3
  Diego Schwartzman 2–3
  Andy Murray 2–4
  Juan Mónaco 2–5
  Rafael Nadal 2–14
  Félix Auger-Aliassime 1–0
  Thomas Enqvist 1–0
  Thomas Johansson 1–0
  Karen Khachanov 1–0
  Casper Ruud 1–0
  Jack Sock 1–0
  Jonas Björkman 1–1
  Hubert Hurkacz 1–1
  Andrey Rublev 1–1
  Denis Shapovalov 1–1
  Stefanos Tsitsipas 1–2
  Jannik Sinner 1–3
  Mikhail Youzhny 1–3
  Kei Nishikori 1–4
  Tomáš Berdych 1–6
  Guillermo Cañas 0–1
  Mardy Fish 0–1
  Rainer Schüttler 0–1
  Mario Ančić 0–2
  Juan Martín del Potro 0–2
  Matteo Berrettini 0–3
  Juan Carlos Ferrero 0–3
  Robin Söderling 0–3
  Dominic Thiem 0–6
  Novak Djokovic 0–17

*Statistics correct as of 25 January 2022.

Top 10 wins 
Monfils has a  record against players who were, at the time the match was played, ranked in the top 10.

Doubles

Career Grand Slam tournament seedings 

The tournaments won by Monfils are bolded.

Singles

ATP career earnings

* Statistics correct as of 20 February 2023.

National participation

Davis Cup matches

   indicates the result of the Davis Cup match followed by the score, date, place of event, the zonal classification and its phase, and the court surface.

Summer Olympics matches

Singles

Doubles

Notable exhibitions

Team competitions

References

External links

 
 
 

Monfils, Gael